Country-by-Country Reporting (or CbCR, sometimes referred to as Country-by-Country Report or CbC report) is an international initiative pioneered by the OECD. It seeks to establish a reporting standard for multinational enterprises (MNEs) containing key tax related information, including financial information and information on employees. Under the OECD rules, the information is to be exchanged between tax authorities of different countries. However, the EU adopted legislation to make the Country-by-Country Reporting publicly available, starting the year after 2024.

History 
Country-by-Country Reporting was initially proposed in 2003 as an accounting standard. The proposal emanated originally from the Tax Justice Network. The key component was information that would allow reconciliation of financial statements across different national jurisdictions. The initiative was initially considered as utopian and remained unsuccessful, until the Base erosion and profit shifting (OECD project) took it over in the context of combatting tax avoidance.
In 2015, Country-by-Country Reporting was formally adopted in Action 13 of OECD’s final report on Base erosion and profit shifting (OECD project). Under Article 13 of the report, MNEs are required to provide information in a standardized format on their international income and tax allocation to national tax authorities.

The OECD initiative led to a growing number of national and internationals proposals built around Country-by-Country Reporting requirements.

Public Country-by-Country Reporting
In a weaker version of the Country-by-Country Reporting, information is exchanged between tax administrations, while remaining confidential to the wider public. Campaigners and commentators have called for a public disclosure of the information contained in the Country-by-Country reports, in order to allow investors to take informed decisions about the tax avoidance of the companies they finance. The U.S. Securities and Exchange Commission would be in a position to require such disclosure from listed companies.

Although the US requires since 2016, Country-by-Country Reporting limited to an exchange of data between public administrations, a disclosure to the public would help the development of ESG investment.

The UK in 2016 decided to make Country-by-Country Reporting public, however this decision has been reversed in 2020 by Rishi Sunak.

In 2021, the EU adopted new legislation which requires companies to publicly disclose Country-by-Country Reporting. Most EU Member States supported the initiative. Large companies, including non-European multinationals will have to comply with the disclosure rules by mid-2024.

Reception and shortcomings
Country-by-Country Reporting is expected to challenge the administrative capacity of the finance departments of companies subjected to the disclosure requirements.

According to commentators, the OECD Country-by-Country Reporting fails to effectively address tax avoidance, especially as the OECD rules do not require the reports to be made public. The responsibility remains with individual countries to go further and require disclosure of information on obscure tax structures of MNEs.
Commentators have also pointed to shortcomings of the EU legislation. The scope of reporting on national profits has been reduced from the initial proposal to only include European countries and certain jurisdictions considered as tax havens, the list of which seems incomplete, as for example Bermuda is excluded. Oxfam expressed concerns in respect of the companies to which the disclosure requirements apply, as only the largest MNEs would fall under the public Country-by-Country Reporting rules.
 
The banking sector has been subject to public since 2014. However, observers reported that the added transparency did not lead financial institutions to curb their tax planning practices.

See also 
 Base erosion and profit shifting (OECD project)
 Double Irish arrangement
 Ireland v Commission

External links 
 Action 13 Country-by-Country Reporting
 EU Directive on Public Country-by-Country Reporting

References

OECD
International taxation
Corporate tax avoidance
Tax accounting
Tax avoidance
Global issues